Spies most commonly refers to people who engage in spying, espionage or clandestine operations.

Spies or The Spies may also refer to:

 Spies (surname), a German surname
 Spies (band), a jazz fusion band
 "Spies" (song), a song by Coldplay
 Spies (1928 film), English title for Spione, a 1928 German film by Fritz Lang
 Spies (1943 film), an animated short film
 Spies, a 1993 Disney TV film starring Shiloh Strong
 Les Espions (The Spies), a 1957 French film
 The Spies (2012 film), a South Korean film
 The Spies (1919 film), a German crime film
 Spies (novel), a 2002 novel by Michael Frayn
 Spies, a 1984 novel by Richard Sapir
 Spies (TV series), a 1987 television series starring George Hamilton
 The Spies (TV series), 1965 British television series

See also 
 
 
 Spiess (disambiguation)
 Spy (disambiguation)
 S*P*Y*S, a 1974 comedy film
 Spys (band), an American rock band